"Take It Easy" is a song by the Eagles.

Take It Easy may also refer to:

Film
 Take It Easy (1974 film), a Polish film
 Take It Easy (2015 film), an Indian Hindi-language film

Music

Albums
 Take It Easy with the Walker Brothers or Take It Easy, by the Walker Brothers, 1965
 Take It Easy, by Billy Hart, 1989
 Take It Easy, by Livin Out Loud, 2015

Songs
 "Take It Easy" (Crystal Gayle song), 1981
 "Take It Easy" (Mad Lion song), 1994
 "Take It Easy" (Stan Walker song), 2012
 "Take It Easy!", by Buono!, 2009
 "Take It Easy (Love Nothing)", by Bright Eyes, 2004
 "Take It Easy", by 3SL, 2002
 "Take It Easy," by Andy Taylor, 1986
 "Take It Easy", by the Animals, B-side of the single "I'm Crying", 1964
 "Take It Easy", by Devon Welsh from Dream Songs, 2018
 "Take It Easy", by the Fugees, 2005
 "Take It Easy", by Gotthard from Homerun, 2001
 "Take It Easy", by Imagine Dragons from Mercury – Act 2, 2022
 "Take It Easy", by Jolin Tsai from Lucky Number, 2001
 "Take It Easy", by Savoy Brown from Looking In, 1970
 "Take It Easy", by Surfer Blood from Astro Coast, 2010
 "Take It Easy", by twlv, 2020
 "Take It Easy", by Vanessa Carlton from Liberman, 2015
 "Take It Easy", written by Xavier Cugat (as Albert De Bru), Irving Taylor, and Vic Mizzy, 1943

Other uses
 Take It Easy (game), an abstract strategy board game
 Take It Easy (TV series), a 1959–1960 Australian variety series

See also
 Take It Easy Baby (disambiguation)